James Tilley (born ) is an English professional rugby league footballer who plays for North Wales Crusaders in Betfred League 1.

In 2013, Tilley made his début for the club against Super League club Castleford Tigers.

Early years
Tilley started his career playing for amateur club Ince Rose Bridge in his hometown of Wigan. He studied The Sutton Academy in St Helens.

Playing career
He was signed by St. Helens at the age of 10. Prior to signing for the first team, he won Under 16s, 18s and 19s Player Of The Year awards in consecutive years. A versatile back rower, he has also been known to play . His preferred position is on the bench. He has now signed for North West Men’s League Division 4 team Rochdale Cobras.

References

External links
Whitehaven profile
Saints Heritage Society profile

1993 births
Living people
English people of Jamaican descent
English rugby league players
North Wales Crusaders players
Rochdale Hornets players
Rugby league hookers
Rugby league locks
Rugby league players from Wigan
Rugby league second-rows
St Helens R.F.C. players
Whitehaven R.L.F.C. players